Alvin "Bubber" Gipson, Sr. (May 7, 1914 – March 25, 1987) was an American Negro league pitcher in the 1940s. A native of Shreveport, Louisiana, Gipson spent most of his career in Birmingham as a mainstay of the Black Barons' pitching staff.

Early life 
Alvin Gipson was born on May 7, 1914 in Shreveport, Louisiana.

Career

Independent ball 
Alvin Gipson began his career playing with Abe Saperstein's independent Cincinnati Buckeyes/New Orleans Crescent Stars, touting a 22-3 record in 1939 or 1940. Gipson was billed as "potentially another Satchel Paige" in press announcing his team's barnstorming tours.

Negro Major Leagues

Chicago American Giants 
Though no league play statistics are listed for Gipson with the Chicago American Giants, he appears in their 1941 team photo taken at Muelenbach Field in Kansas City.

Birmingham Black Barons 
Gipson joined the Black Barons in 1941 and was on the pitching staff as they won the NAL pennant in 1943 and 1944. He registered a 0-1 record in the NAL's split season playoffs against the American Giants in 1943, but did not make any appearances in either World Series.

1942 All-Star Game 
In 1942, two East-West All-Star games were played to benefit the Army-Navy Relief Fund. Gipson was named to the West's roster for the second game, held in Cleveland at Municipal Stadium. Gipson made an appearance in relief, pitching 3 innings and giving up 2 runs (1 earned) in the 9-2 loss to the East.

Strikeout Record 
On August 21, 1943, Alvin Gipson struck out 20 Philadelphia Stars batters in Birmingham, setting a Negro American League record. In the 5-1 victory, Gipson struck out the side in 4 of the 9 innings he pitched, including the ninth. Stars second baseman Marvin Williams was fanned 4 times. Following his performance, fans rushed the field to celebrate.

Military service 
On July 2, 1945 Gipson was drafted into the United States Army.

Return to barnstorming 
After leaving the Black Barons, Gipson pitched for the independent Detroit Senators and Cincinnati Crescents. Both teams were managed by Winfield Welch, Gipson's manager in Birmingham.

Return to Chicago 
In 1949, Gipson followed his old manager Welch and returned to the American Giants, staying with the team through the 1950 campaign. Gipson represented the American Giants on a Negro League all star team taking on an integrated Major League all star team in October 1950.

Death and legacy 
Alvin Gipson died on March 25, 1987 at the VA Medical Center in his hometown of Shreveport, Louisiana following a brief illness. In 1999, The Times newspaper in Shreveport listed Gipson among the top 100 baseball players to come from the area.

References

External links
 and Seamheads

1914 births
1987 deaths
Birmingham Black Barons players
Chicago American Giants players
20th-century African-American sportspeople
Cincinnati Crescents players